Oomen is a Dutch-language surname, derived from the word oom, meaning uncle. An alternative origin may be the given name "Omaar". People with this surname include:

 (born 1945), Dutch pianist, composer and conductor
Erica Oomen (born 1950s), Dutch track racing cyclist
 (born 1960), Dutch children's writer, illustrator and designer
 (born 1965), Dutch snooker referee
 (1916–1992), Dutch child psychologist known for her Snijders-Oomen nonverbal intelligence test
Ria Oomen-Ruijten (born 1950), Dutch CDA politician and MEP
Matthias Oomen (born 1981), German Green politician
Sam Oomen (born 1995), Dutch road racing cyclist
Wilhelm Josef Oomens (1918–2008), Dutch Jesuit and painter

See also
Zentveld & Oomen, Dutch dance production team
Ooms, surname of the same origin

References

Dutch-language surnames
Patronymic surnames